Alex White is a skateboarder from Los Angeles, California.

Skateboarding
Alex White is one of a very small group of female skaters.  She began skateboarding at the age of 13 in Los Angeles.

Skateboard videos

White is featured on the skate DVD Getting Nowhere Faster. This DVD features skateboarding footage of Alex White, as well as footage of her being detained for skateboarding on private property.

References

External links
Alex White Interview

American skateboarders
Living people
Female skateboarders
American sportswomen
Year of birth missing (living people)
21st-century American women